Wahaka may refer to:

 The phonetic pronunciation of the state of Oaxaca in Mexico
 The name of a brand of an artisanal mezcal produced by Zapotec family in San Dionisio, Oaxaca
 Wahaka, the name of the rock also known as the "Three Brothers (Yosemite)", in Yosemite Valley, Mariposa County, California
 Wahaka, a former Awami village at the base of the rock known as the "Three Brothers", in Yosemite Valley, Mariposa County, California
 USS Wahaka (YTB-526), later YTM-526, a United States Navy tug placed in commission in 1947

See also 
 Oaxaca—a homonym